Pouteria myrsinoides is an Australian tree in the family Sapotaceae. The common names include yellow plumwood, axe-handle wood and blunt-leaved coondoo. It occurs in seaside rainforests and drier rainforests from the Forster, New South Wales to the Lakeland Downs in tropical Queensland. The subspecies reticulata occurs on Lord Howe Island and in New Caledonia.

It is a small tree up to 12 metres tall with a stem diameter of 25 cm. The leaves are 2 to 10 cm long and 1 to 4 cm wide. Flowering occurs between May and November, sometimes as early as February. The fruit is a thin fleshed, purple/black berry, 1.5 to 3 cm long, containing one to three seeds.

The specific epithet myrsinoides refers to a similarity of the leaves of certain plants in the genus Myrsine. The taxonomy of this species is currently under review.

References

myrsinoides
Trees of Australia
Flora of Queensland
Flora of New South Wales
Ericales of Australia
Taxa named by Ferdinand von Mueller